Tadashi Asai (28 November 1935 – 6 January 1990) was a Japanese wrestler who competed in the 1956 Summer Olympics and in the 1960 Summer Olympics.

References

External links
 

1935 births
1990 deaths
Olympic wrestlers of Japan
Wrestlers at the 1956 Summer Olympics
Wrestlers at the 1960 Summer Olympics
Japanese male sport wrestlers
Asian Games medalists in wrestling
Wrestlers at the 1962 Asian Games
Asian Games gold medalists for Japan
Medalists at the 1962 Asian Games
20th-century Japanese people